Bulbus is a genus of predatory sea snails, marine gastropod mollusks in the family Naticidae, the moon snails.

Species
Species within the genus Bulbus include:
 Bulbus fragilis (Leach, 1819)
 Bulbus normalis (Middendorff, 1851)
 Bulbus smithii Brown, 1839
 Bulbus striatus Golikov & Sirenko, 1983
 Bulbus tenuiculus (G.B. Sowerby III, 1915)
Species brought into synonymy
 Bulbus benthicolus Dell, 1990: synonym of Falsilunatia benthicola (Dell, 1990)
 Bulbus carcellesi Dell, 1990: synonym of Falsilunatia carcellesi (Dell, 1990)
 Bulbus flavus (Gould, 1839): synonym of Bulbus smithii T. Brown, 1839
 Bulbus globosus (Jeffreys, 1885): synonym of Phalium saburon (Bruguière, 1792)
 Bulbus incurvus Dunker, 1852: synonym of Rapa incurva (Dunker, 1852)
 Bulbus scotianus Dell, 1990 Dell, 1990: synonym of Falsilunatia scotiana (Dell, 1990)

References

 Gofas, S.; Le Renard, J.; Bouchet, P. (2001). Mollusca, in: Costello, M.J. et al. (Ed.) (2001). European register of marine species: a check-list of the marine species in Europe and a bibliography of guides to their identification. Collection Patrimoines Naturels, 50: pp. 180–213
 Torigoe K. & Inaba A. (2011) Revision on the classification of Recent Naticidae. Bulletin of the Nishinomiya Shell Museum 7: 133 + 15 pp., 4 pls

External links

Naticidae
Gastropod genera